The 2002 Ohio gubernatorial election took place on November 5, 2002. Incumbent Republican Governor of Ohio Bob Taft ran for re-election to a second and final term as governor, and he was opposed by Democratic nominee Tim Hagan, a former Cuyahoga County Commissioner. The race between Taft and Hagan was not competitive, and Taft was re-elected by a substantial margin, ensuring him a second term in office.

Democratic primary

Candidates
Tim Hagan, former Cuyahoga County Commissioner and candidate for Cleveland Mayor in 1989

Results

Republican primary

Candidates
Bob Taft, incumbent Governor of Ohio

Results

General election

Predictions

Polling

Results
Taft won reelection easily, winning by nearly 19.5% and by 628,083 votes. Taft did well in most parts of the state. Hagan only managed to win six out of 88 counties. Hagan won Lorain County, Cuyahoga County, Summit County, Trumbull County, Mahoning County, and Athens County. Despite winning in a landslide Taft would go on to be extremely unpopular in his second term, leaving office with a 2% approval rating, the lowest for any statewide official in modern U.S. history. In 2006 Democrat Ted Strickland would easily go on to defeat Republican Ohio Secretary of State Ken Blackwell. It resulted in a gain for the Democrats, and was the first time they had obtained the governorship in 16 years.

Notes

References

Gubernatorial
2002
Ohio